Laura García-Godoy Oliva is a telenovela, theatre, film actress from the Dominican Republic.

García-Godoy was born in Santiago de los Caballeros. She is descended from Federico García Godoy (1857–1924), Cuban-born Dominican novelist, literary critic, historian and educator, son of Cuban-born Dominican poet and academician Federico García Copley (1890). She is also descended from Achille Fondeur, a Frenchman, brother of Colonel Furcy Fondeur.

In 2013, García-Godoy participated in the Luz García’s contest "Cuerpos hot del verano".

Filmography

References 

Living people
Year of birth missing (living people)
Dominican Republic people of Cuban descent
Dominican Republic people of English descent
Dominican Republic people of French descent
Dominican Republic people of Galician descent
Dominican Republic people of Spanish descent
People from Santiago de los Caballeros
Dominican Republic people of Calabrian descent
Dominican Republic film actresses
Dominican Republic stage actresses
Dominican Republic telenovela actresses
White Dominicans